Constituent Assembly elections were held in Honduras on 22 September 1957. In November the Assembly elected Ramón Villeda Morales as president.

Results

Aftermath
On 16 November the Assembly elected Ramón Villeda Morales as president by a vote of 37 to 20. Following his election, the Liberal Party formed a coalition government with the National Party and the National Reformist Movement, with cabinet portfolios divided on a 6:2:1 ratio. However, the National Party and National Reformist Movement held protests in Tegucigalpa on the day of the presidential vote.

References

Bibliography
Anderson, Thomas P. The war of the dispossessed: Honduras and El Salvador, 1969. Lincoln: University of Nebraska Press. 1981. 
Bardales B., Rafael. Historia del Partido Nacional de Honduras. Tegucigalpa: Servicopiax Editores. 1980. 
Becerra, Longino. Evolución histórica de Honduras. Tegucigalpa: Baktun Editorial. 1983. 
Dunkerley, James. Power in the isthmus: a political history of modern Central America. London: Verso. 1988. 
Elections in the Americas A Data Handbook Volume 1. North America, Central America, and the Caribbean. Edited by Dieter Nohlen. 2005. 
Euraque, Darío A. Reinterpreting the banana republic: region and state in Honduras, 1870-1972. Chapel Hill: The University of North Carolina Press. 1996. 
Fernández, Arturo. Partidos políticos y elecciones en Honduras 1980. Tegucigalpa: Editorial Guaymuras. Second edition. 1983. 
Kantor, Harry. Patterns of politics and political systems in Latin America. Chicago: Rand McNally and Company. 1969. 
MacCameron, Robert. Bananas, labor and politics in Honduras: 1954-1963. Syracuse: Syracuse University. 1983. 
Morris, James A. Honduras: caudillo politics and military rulers. Boulder: Westview Press. 1984. 
Parker, Franklin D. The Central American republics. Westport: Greenwood Press. Reprint of 1964 original. 1981. 
Political handbook of the world 1957. New York, 1958. 
Posas, Mario and Rafael del Cid. La construcción del sector público y del estado nacional en Honduras (1876-1979). San José: EDUCA. Second edition. 1983. 
Schulz, Donald E. and Deborah Sundloff Schulz. The United States, Honduras, and the crisis in Central America. Boulder: Westview Press. 1994. 
Vallejo Hernández, Hilario René. Crisis histórica del poder político en Honduras: 168 años de ‘Coquimbos’ y ‘Cachurecos.’ Honduras: Ultra-Graph. 1990. 
Villars, Rina. Para la casa más que para el mundo: sufragismo y feminismo en la historia de Honduras. Tegucigalpa: Editorial Guaymuras. 2001. 

Elections in Honduras
Honduras
1957 in Honduras
September 1957 events in North America
Election and referendum articles with incomplete results